This is a list of Arkansas suffragists, suffrage groups and others associated with the cause of women's suffrage in Arkansas.

Groups 

 Arkansas Equal Suffrage Association (AESA), organized in 1888.
Arkansas Federation of Women's Clubs (AFWC).
 Arkansas Woman Suffrage Association (AWSA), formed in 1881.
The second iteration of the Arkansas Woman Suffrage Association (AWSA), created in 1914. It was also known as the Arkansas Equal Suffrage Central Committee (AESCC).
Washington County Women's Suffrage Association, formed in 1915.
Women's Political Equality League (PEL), starts meeting in 1913.

Suffragists 

 Freda Hogan Ameringer (Huntington).
Bernie Babcock (Little Rock).
Ida Jones Brooks (Little Rock).
Mary Burt Brooks.
Haryot Holt Cahoon.
Hattie Wyatt Caraway.
Fannie L. Chunn (Little Rock).
Florence Brown Cotnam (Little Rock).
Catherine Campbell Cunningham (Little Rock).
Alice S. Ellington.
Pauline Floyd (El Dorado).
Minnie Rutherford Fuller (Little Rock).
Lizzie Dorman Fyler (Eureka Springs).
Olive Gatlin Leigh.
Jean Vernor Jennings (Little Rock).
Adele Johnson (Hot Springs).
Mary W. Loughborough (Little Rock).
Josephine Miller (Little Rock).
James Mitchell (Little Rock).
 Clara McDiarmid (Little Rock).
Gertrude Watkins (Little Rock).

Politicians supporting women's suffrage 

 E.P. Hill.
Miles Ledford Langley (Arkadelphia).
John A. Riggs (Garland County).
George P. Whittington (Hot Springs).

Places 

 Little Rock City Hall.

Publications 

 Woman's Chronicle.

Suffragists campaigning in Arkansas 

 Susan B. Anthony.
Carrie Chapman Catt.
Phoebe Couzins.
Frances A. Griffin.
Lide Meriwether.
Alice Paul.
Anna Howard Shaw.
Mabel Vernon.

Anti-suffragists in Arkansas 
People

 Walker Smith (Magnolia).

See also 

 Timeline of women's suffrage in Arkansas
 Women's suffrage in Arkansas
 Women's suffrage in states of the United States
 Women's suffrage in the United States
 Women's poll tax repeal movement

References

Sources 

 

Arkansas suffrage

Arkansas suffragists
Activists from Arkansas
History of Arkansas
Suffragists